Holy Transfiguration Monastery or Holy Transfiguration Monastery Church may refer to:

Albania 
 Holy Transfiguration Monastery Church, Çatistë
 Holy Transfiguration Monastery Church, Mingul

Canada 
 Holy Transfiguration Monastery (Milton, Ontario)

Ukraine 
 Holy Transfiguration Monastery (Horodok, Ukraine)